Berlovine is a village in Serbia. It is situated in the Ljubovija municipality, in the Mačva District of Central Serbia. The village had a population of 276 in 2002, all of whom were ethnic Serbs.

Historical population

1948: 857
1953: 879
1961: 789
1971: 657
1981: 550
1991: 382
2002: 276

References

See also
List of places in Serbia

Populated places in Mačva District
Ljubovija